Verplanck S. Van Antwerp (8 June 1807 – 2 December 1875) was a Brevet Brigadier General in the Union Army during the American Civil War and served as U.S. Land Office Receiver and Secretary to the Commissioner of Indian Affairs.

Biography
Van Antwerp was born 8 June 1807 in Albany, New York. In the 1830s and 1840s, he was a U.S. Land Office Receiver and Secretary to the Commissioner of Indian Affairs, in Keokuk, Iowa. During the civil war, he served as a Major and Chief Engineer under Major General James G. Blunt, from 1861 to 1862. He was later transferred to the Army of the Potomac, as Acting Assistant Adjutant General on Major General Winfield Scott Hancock's staff and remained in post until the end of the war.

Family

Van Antwerp married Jane Maria Yates (1815-1870), daughter of John Van Ness Yates, of Albany, and granddaughter of Robert Yates. They had 4 children:
 Catharine Van Antwerp, born c. March 1831, died c. 1863
 Caroline Van Antwerp, born 16 January 1843, died 15 Jan 1925
 Yates Van Antwerp, born c. 1847
 Jesse F Van Antwerp, born c. January 1850

1807 births
1875 deaths
Union Army officers
Military personnel from Albany, New York